FBC Piérola is a Peruvian football club, playing in the city of Arequipa, Peru.

The club were founded 1922 and play in the Copa Perú which is the third division of the Peruvian league.

History

The club have played at the highest level of Peruvian football on one occasion, in the 1974 Torneo Descentralizado when was relegated.

Rivalries
FBC Piérola has had a long-standing rivalry with Melgar, Aurora, Sportivo Huracán, and White Star.

Honours

Regional
Liga Departamental de Arequipa: 2
Winners (2): 1973, 1996

Liga Distrital de Arequipa: 4
Winners (4): 1973, 1996, 2006, 2012

See also
List of football clubs in Peru
Peruvian football league system

Football clubs in Peru
Association football clubs established in 1922